The Silver Reuben Award is an award for cartoonists organized by the National Cartoonists Society. Until 2015, the awards was known as the National Cartoonists Society Division Awards.

Current categories

Advertising Illustration Award
From its inception until 1975 this award was known as the Advertising and Illustration award. The following year, it divided into two separate categories, Advertising and Illustration, combining again from 1982 to 1985. They divided again in 1986. This category was titled Commercial in 1989 and 1990.

1956 Harry Devlin
1957 Russell Patterson
1958 Carl Rose
1959 Ronald Searle
1960 Noel Sickles
1961 Eric Gurney
1962 Harry Devlin and Noel Sickles (tie)
1963 Harry Devlin
1964 Dick Hodgins, Jr.
1965 Ronald Searle
1966 Dick Hodgins, Jr.
1967 Roy Doty
1968 Dave Pascal
1969 Ronald Michaud
1970 Roy Doty
1971 Eric Gurney
1972 Irwin Caplan
1973 Al Jaffee
1974 Bill Kresse
1975 Burne Hogarth
1976 Mike Berry
1977 Charles Saxon
1978 Roy Doty
1979 Mischa Richter
1980 Jack Davis
1981 Irwin Caplan
1982 Arnold Roth
1983 Ronald Michaud
1984 Arnold Roth
1985 Arnold Roth
1986 Ronald Searle
1987 Ronald Searle
1988 Bob Bindig
1989 Roy Doty
1990 Steve Duquette
1991 W. B. Park
1992 Daryl Cagle
1993 Edward Sorel
1994 Jerry Buckley
1995 Jack Pittman
1996 Roy Doty
1997 B. B. Sams
1998 Jack Pittman
1999 Craig McKay
2000 Craig McKay (Cincinnati Chamber of Commerce posters)
2001 Pat Byrnes
2002 Jim Hummel
2003 Tom Richmond
2004 Mike Lester
2005 Roy Doty
2006 Tom Richmond
2007 Tom Richmond
2008 Craig McKay
2009 Steve Brodner
2010 Dave Whamond
2011 Nick Galifianakis
2012 Ed Steckley
2013 Rich Powell
2014 Ed Steckley
2015 Anton Emdin
2016 Luke McGarry
2017 Dave Whamond
2018 James E. Lyle
2019 Luke McGarry
2020 Luke McGarry
2021 Johnny Sampson

Animation Award
In 1989 and 1990, the category was titled Electronic Media. In 1995, it was divided into Feature Animation and Television Animation. The Online Animation Award category was introduced starting with the 2018 awards, but it didn't give out its first award until the following year.

1957 Walt Disney
1958 Paul Terry
1960 Bill Hanna & Joe Barbera
1961 Walt Disney
1963 Walt Disney
1972 Bill Melendez
1973 Johnny Hart
1974 Jim Logan
1975 Isadore Klein
1976 Howard Beckerman
1977 Sergio Aragonés
1978 Ralph Bakshi
1979 Hilda Terry
1980 Selby Kelly
1981 Selby Kelly
1982 Bill Melendez
1983 Howard Beckerman
1984 Nancy Beiman
1985 Chuck Jones
1986 Chuck Jones
1987 Chuck Jones
1988 Bill Melendez
1989 Chuck Jones
1990 Chuck Jones
1991 Glen Keane (Beauty and the Beast)
1992 Eric Goldberg (Aladdin)
1993 Tim Burton (The Nightmare Before Christmas)
1994 David Silverman (The Simpsons)

Feature Animation Award

1995 Joe Grant (Pocahontas)
1996 Mark Miller & crew
1997 Nik Ranieri (Hercules)
1998 Chen Yi Chang (Mulan)
1999 Brad Bird (The Iron Giant)
2000 Eric Goldberg (Fantasia 2000: "Rhapsody in Blue")
2001 Pete Docter (Monsters, Inc.)
2002 Chris Sanders (Lilo & Stitch)
2003 Andrew Stanton (Finding Nemo)
2004 Brad Bird (The Incredibles)
2005 Nick Park (Wallace & Gromit: The Curse of the Were-Rabbit)
2006 Carter Goodrich (Open Season)
2007 David Silverman (The Simpsons Movie)
2008 Nicolas Marlet (Kung Fu Panda)
2009 Ronnie del Carmen  (Up)
2010 Nicolas Marlet (How to Train Your Dragon)
2011 Mark McCreery (Rango)
2012 Joann Sfar (The Rabbi's Cat)
2013 Hayao Miyazaki (The Wind Rises)
2014 Tomm Moore (Song Of The Sea)
2015 Steve Martino (The Peanuts Movie)
2016 Cory Loftis (Zootopia)
2017 Lee Unkrich & Adrian Molina (Coco)
2018 Justin K. Thompson (Spider-Man: Into the Spider-Verse)
2019 Nelson Lowry, Santiago Montiel & Trevor Dalmer (Missing Link)
2020 Maria Pareja (Wolfwalkers)

Television Animation Award

1995 Bruce Timm (Batman: The Animated Series)
1996 Everett Peck (Duckman)
1997 David Feiss (Cow and Chicken)
1998 Danny Antonucci (Cartoon Sushi)
1999 Rich Moore (Futurama)
1999 Danny Antonucci (Ed, Edd and Eddy)
2000 Gary Baseman (Teacher's Pet)
2001 Chris Reccardi & Lynne Naylor (Samurai Jack)
2002 Stephen Hillenburg (SpongeBob SquarePants)
2003 Paul Rudish (The Powerpuff Girls, Samurai Jack, and Star Wars: Clone Wars)
2004 Craig McCracken (Foster's Home for Imaginary Friends)
2005 David Silverman (The Simpsons)
2006 Craig McCracken (Foster's Home for Imaginary Friends)
2007 Stephen Silver (Kim Possible)
2008 Jorge R. Gutierrez & Sandra Equihua (El Tigre: The Adventures of Manny Rivera)
2009 Seth MacFarlane (Family Guy)
2010 Dave Filoni (Star Wars: The Clone Wars)
2011 Erik Wiese (The Mighty B)
2012 Rich Webber (DC Nation) Aardman Animation Studios
2013 Paul Rudish (Mickey Mouse)
2014 Patrick McHale (Over the Garden Wall)
2015 Drew Hodges (Tumble Leaf)
2016 Chris Savino (The Loud House)
2017 Alan Bodner (Tangled: The Series)
2018 Chris Mitchell & Keiko Murayama (The Adventures of Rocky and Bullwinkle)
2019 Genndy Tartakovsky (Primal)
2020 Genndy Tartakovsky (Primal)

Online Animation Award

 2019 Joe Bluhm (Pinocchio – A Modern Retelling)
 2020 Sammy Moore & Even Stenhouse (Brawl Stars: Barley's Bar and Piper's Sugar and Spice)
Art for Animated Media

 2021 Lindsey Olivares

Book Illustration Award

1999 T. Lewis
2000 Mike Lester (A Is for Salad)
2001 Frank Cho
2002 B. B. Sams
2003 Chris Payne
2004 Geefwee Boedoe
2005 Ralph Steadman
2006 Mike Lester
2007 Sandra Boynton
2008 Mike Lester
2009 Dave Whamond
2010 Mike Lester (The ***Book)
2011 John Rocco (Blackout)
2012 John Manders
2013 William Joyce
2014 Marla Frazee
2015 Sydney Smith
2016 Dave Whamond
2017 Adam Rex (The Legend of Rock Paper Scissors)
2018 Rafael Lopez
2019 Stacy Curtis (Karate Kakapo)
2020 Janee Trasler (Frog Meets Dog, Goat in a Boat, Hog on a Log)
2021 Stacy Curtis (Penguin and Moose Brave the Night)

Comic Books Award
In 1970, the Comic Books Award was divided into Humor Comic Books and Story Comic Books. They were merged back together in 1982. In 1989 and 1990, the Comic Books award was merged with the Magazine and Book Illustration Award. It was separated back into its own award in 1991. A separate award for Graphic Novels was created in 2009.

1956 Jerry Robinson
1957 Wallace Wood
1958 Carmine Infantino and Steve Douglas (tie)
1959 Wallace Wood
1960 Bob Oksner
1961 Bob Oksner
1962 Bob Gustafson
1963 Frank Thorne
1964 Paul Fung Jr.
1965 Wallace Wood
1966 Al Williamson
1967 Will Eisner
1968 Will Eisner
1969 Will Eisner
1970 Henry Boltinoff (Humor) and Tom Gill (Story)
1971 Bob Gustafson (Humor) and Gil Kane (Story)
1972 Bob Gustafson (Humor) and Gil Kane (Story)
1973 Sergio Aragonés (Humor) and Frank Springer (Story)
1974 Sergio Aragonés (Humor) and Joe Kubert (Story)
1975 Hy Eisman (Humor) and Gil Kane (Story)
1976 Sergio Aragonés (Humor) and Tex Blaisdell (Story)
1977 David Pascall (Humor) and Frank Springer (Story)
1978 Frank Johnson (Humor) and Alden McWilliams (Story)
1979 Al Jaffee (Humor) and Will Eisner (Story)
1980 Paul Fung, Jr. (Humor) and Joe Kubert (Story)
1981 George Wildman (Humor) and Frank Springer (Story)
1982 Bob Gustafson
1983 Hy Eisman
1984 Kurt Schaffenberger
1985 Dick Ayers
1986 Sergio Aragonés
1987 Will Eisner
1988 Will Eisner
1989 N/A. See Magazine and Book Illustration Award.
1990 N/A. See Magazine and Book Illustration Award
1991 Frank Miller
1992 Todd McFarlane
1993 Mark Chiarello
1994 Dan Jurgens
1995 Jeff Smith (Bone)
1996 Jeff Smith
1997 Don Perlin
1998 Alex Ross (Superman: Peace on Earth)
1999 Chris Ware (Acme Novelty Library)
2000 Dan DeCarlo (Betty and Veronica)
2001 Frank Cho (Liberty Meadows)
2002 Stan Sakai (Usagi Yojimbo (Dark Horse Comics))
2003 Terry Moore
2004 Darwyn Cooke (DC: The New Frontier)
2005 Paul Chadwick (Concrete: The Human Dilemma)
2006 Gene Luen Yang
2007 Shaun Tan (The Arrival)
2008 Cyril Pedrosa
2009 Paul Pope
2010 Jill Thompson (Beasts of Burden)
2011 J. H. Williams III (Batwoman)
2012 Bernie Wrightson (Frankenstein Alive, Alive!)
2013 Sergio Aragonés
2014 Jason Latour (Southern Bastards)
2015 Ben Caldwell
2016 Max Sarin and Liz Fleming (Giant Days)
2017 Sana Takeda (Monstress Vol. 2 The Blood)
2018 Greg Smallwood
2019 Stan Sakai (Usagi Yojimbo)
2020 Walt Simonson (Ragnarok: The Breaking of Helheim)
2021 David Peterson (Mouse Guard)

Editorial Cartoons Award

1956 Bill Crawford (Newark News)
1957 Bill Crawford (Newark News) and Herbert Block (Washington Post) (tie)
1958 Bill Crawford (Newark News)
1959 Bill Mauldin (St Louis Post-Dispatch)
1960 Herbert Block (Washington Post)
1961 Karl Hubenthal (Los Angeles Examiner)
1962 John Fischetti (New York Herald Tribune)
1963 John Fischetti (New York Herald Tribune)
1964 John Fischetti (New York Herald Tribune)
1965 John Fischetti (New York Herald Tribune)
1966 Bill Crawford (Syndicated)
1967 Karl Hubenthal (Los Angeles Herald-Examiner)
1968 Warren King (New York Daily News)
1969 Blaine (Hamilton Spectator)
1970 Karl Hubenthal (Los Angeles Herald-Examiner)
1971 Pat Oliphant (Denver Post)
1972 Dick Hodgins, Jr.
1973 Pat Oliphant (Denver Post)
1974 Pat Oliphant (Denver Post)
1975 John Pierotti (New York Post)
1976 Dick Hodgins, Jr.
1977 Jeff MacNelly (Richmond News Leader)
1978 Paul Szep (Boston Globe)
1979 Frank Evers (New York Daily News)
1980 Larry Wright (Detroit News)
1981 Etta Hulme (Fort Worth Star Telegram)
1982 Mike Peters (Dayton Daily News)
1983 Mike Peters (Dayton Daily News)
1984 Pat Oliphant (Syndicated) and Larry Wright (Detroit News) (tie)
1985 Don Wright (Miami News)
1986 Jim Borgman (Cincinnati Enquirer)
1987 Jim Borgman (Cincinnati Enquirer)
1988 Jim Borgman (Cincinnati Enquirer)
1989 Pat Oliphant (Syndicated)
1990 Pat Oliphant (Syndicated)
1991 Pat Oliphant (Syndicated)
1992 Jim Morin (Miami Herald)
1993 Bill Schorr (Syndicated)
1994 Jim Borgman (Cincinnati Enquirer)
1995 Chip Bok (Akron Beacon Journal)
1996 Bill Day (Syndicated)
1997 Glenn McCoy (Belleville News-Democrat)
1998 Etta Hulme (Fort Worth Star Telegram)
1999 Chip Bok (Akron Beacon Journal)
2000 Jerry Holbert (Boston Herald)
2001 Mike Luckovich (Atlanta Journal-Constitution)
2002 Clay Bennett (Christian Science Monitor)
2003 Tom Toles (Washington Post)
2004 Jeff Parker (Florida Today)
2005 Jim Borgman (Cincinnati Enquirer)
2006 Michael Ramirez (Investor's Business Daily)
2007 Bill Schorr
2008 Michael Ramirez
2009 John Sherffius (Syndicated)
2010 Gary Varvel
2011 Michael Ramirez
2012 Jen Sorensen
2013 Michael Ramirez
2014 Michael Ramirez
2015 Ann Telnaes
2016 Mike Luckovich (Atlanta Journal-Constitution)
2017 Clay Bennett
2018 Rob Rogers
2019 Pat Bagley
2020 Bruce MacKinnon
2021 Ruben Bolling

Gag Cartoons Award

1956 Chon Day
1957 John Gallagher
1958 Eldon Dedini
1959 Vahan Shirvanian
1961 Eldon Dedini
1962 Chon Day
1963 Jack Tippit
1964 Eldon Dedini
1965 Orlando Busino
1966 Jack Tippit
1967 Orlando Busino
1968 Orlando Busino
1969 George Wolfe
1970 Chon Day
1971 John Gallagher
1972 Don Orehek
1973 George Wolfe
1974 Mischa Richter
1975 George Wolfe
1976 George Wolfe
1977 Bill Hoest
1978 Henry Martin
1979 Jack Markow
1980 Charles Saxon
1981 Bo Brown
1982 Don Orehek
1983 Sergio Aragones
1984 Don Orehek
1985 Don Orehek
1986 Charles Saxon
1987 Charles Saxon
1988 Eldon Dedini
1991 Arnie Levin
1992 Arnie Levin
1993 George Booth
1994 John Reiner
1995 Lee Lorenz
1996 Glenn McCoy
1997 Mark Tonra
1998 Charles Barsotti
1999 Rick Stromoski
2000 Kim Warp
2001 Jerry King
2002 Glenn McCoy
2003 Glenn McCoy
2004 Robert Weber
2005 Glenn McCoy
2006 Drew Dernavitch
2007 Mort Gerberg
2008 Mort Gerberg
2009 Glenn McCoy
2010 Gary McCoy
2011 Zach Kanin
2012 Roz Chast
2013 Matt Diffee
2014 Liza Donnelly
2015 David Sipress
2016 Will McPhail
2017 Pat Byrnes
2018 Joe Dator
2019 Amy Hwang
2020 Ellis Rosen
2021 Christopher Weyant

Graphic Novels Award

2009 David Mazzucchelli (Asterios Polyp)
2010 Joyce Farmer (Special Exits)
2011 Ben Katchor (The Cardboard Valise)
2012 Chris Ware (Building Stories)
2013 Andrew C. Robinson (The 5th Beatle)
2014 Jules Feiffer (Kill My Mother)
2015 Ethan Young (Nanjing: The Burning City)
2016 Rick Geary (Black Dahlia)
2017 Emil Ferris (My Favorite Thing Is Monsters)
2018 Peter Kuper (Kafkaesque)
2019 Harmony Becker (They Called Us Enemy)
2020 Jared Cullum (Kodi)
2021 Eric Powell (Did You Hear What Eddie Gein Done?)

Greeting Cards Award

1991 Patrick McDonnell
1992 Sandra Boynton
1993 W. B. Park
1994 Roy Doty
1995 Rick Stromoski
1996 Suzy Spafford
1997 Dave Coverly
1998 Rick Stromoski
1999 Anne Gibbons
2000 Bill Brewer
2001 Oliver Christianson
2002 Glenn McCoy
2003 Glenn McCoy
2004 Glenn McCoy
2005 Gary McCoy
2006 Carla Ventresca
2007 Dave Mowder
2008 Jem Sullivan
2009 Debbie Tomasi
2010 Jim Benton
2011 Glenn McCoy
2012 Jem Sullivan
2013 Mark Parisi
2014 Glenn McCoy
2015 Jim Benton
2016 Debbie Tomasi
2018 Maria Scrivan
2019 Scott Nickel
2020 Scott Nickel
2021 Scott Jensen

Magazine Feature and Magazine Illustration Award
This award (originally titled Illustration) was separated from the Advertising and Illustration Award from 1976 to 1981. It then became permanently separated in 1986. The award name changed to Magazine and Book Illustration in 1989, and then changed to the current name in 2003. In 2018, this and Magazine Feature/Magazine Illustration Award was folded into one category to become Newspaper & Magazine Illustration.

1976 Arnold Roth
1977 Harry Devlin
1978 Harry Devlin
1979 Arnold Roth
1980 Ronald Searle
1981 Arnold Roth
1986 Arnold Roth
1987 Arnold Roth
1988 Arnold Roth
1989 Sergio Aragonés
1990 Harry Devlin
1991 Patrick McDonnell
1992 Burne Hogarth
1993 Hal Mayforth
1994 Rick Geary
1995 Richard Thompson
1996 Doug Cushman
1997 Guy Gilchrist
1998 Guy Gilchrist
1999 Kevin Rechin
2000 Peter de Sève
2001 Mark Brewer
2002 C. F. Payne
2003 Hermann Meija
2004 Jack Pittman
2005 C. F. Payne
2006 Steve Brodner
2007 Daryll Collins
2008 Sam Viviano
2009 Ray Alma
2010 Anton Emdin
2011 Edward Sorel
2012 Anton Emdin
2013 Dave Whamond
2014 Tom Richmond
2015 Anton Emdin
2016 Jon Adams
2017 Peter Kuper

Newspaper Illustration Award
In 2018,this and Magazine Feature/Magazine Illustration Award was folded into one category to become Newspaper & Magazine Illustration.

1994 Jerry Dowling
1995 Richard Thompson
1996 David Clark
1997 Bob Staake
1998 Grey Blackwell
1999 Pierre Bellocq
2000 Drew Friedman
2001 Miel Prudencio Ma
2002 Steve McGarry
2003 Bob Rich
2004 Michael McParlane
2005 Bob Rich
2006  Laurie Triefeldt
2007 Sean Kelly
2008 Mark Marturello
2009 Tom Richmond
2010 Michael McParlane
2011 Bob Rich
2012 Dave Whamond
2013 Miel Prudencio Ma
2014 Anton Emdin
2015 Anton Emdin
2016 David Rowe
2017 Dave Whamond

Newspaper & Magazine Illustration

2018 Tom Bunk
2019 Tom Richmond
2020 Peter Kuper
2021 Nick Galifianakis

Newspaper Panel Award

1956 George Lichty (Grin and Bear It)
1957 Jimmy Hatlo (They'll Do It Every Time)
1958 Bob Barnes (The Better Half)
1959 Jimmy Hatlo (They'll Do It Every Time)
1960 George Lichty (Grin and Bear It)
1961 George Clark (The Neighbors)
1962 George Lichty (Grin and Bear It)
1963 Jerry Robinson (Still Life)
1964 George Lichty (Grin and Bear It)
1965 Jim Berry (Berry's World)
1966 Jim Berry (Berry's World)
1967 Bil Keane (The Family Circus)
1968 Bob Dunn  (They'll Do It Every Time)
1969 Bob Dunn (They'll Do It Every Time)
1970 Jack Tippit (Amy)
1971 Bil Keane (The Family Circus)
1972 Jim Berry (Berry's World)
1973 Bil Keane (The Family Circus)
1974 Bil Keane (The Family Circus)
1975 Bill Hoest (The Lockhorns)
1976 Paul Frehm (Ripley's Believe It or Not!)
1977 Ted Key (Hazel)
1978 Brad Anderson (Marmaduke)
1979 Bob Dunn & Al Scaduto (They'll Do It Every Time)
1980 Bill Hoest (The Lockhorns)
1981 Henry Boltinoff (Stoker the Broker)
1982 Jim Unger (Herman)
1983 Bob Thaves (Frank and Ernest)
1984 Bob Thaves (Frank and Ernest)
1985 Gary Larson (The Far Side)
1986 Bob Thaves (Frank and Ernest)
1987 Jim Unger (Herman)
1988 Gary Larson (The Far Side)
1989 N/A. See Newspaper Comic Strip Award.
1990 N/A. See Newspaper Comic Strip Award.
1991 Al Scaduto (They'll Do It Every Time)
1992 Don Addis (Bent Offerings)
1993 Bill Rechin (Out of Bounds)
1994 Dave Coverly (Speed Bump)
1995 Wiley Miller (Non Sequitur)
1996 Wiley Miller (Non Sequitur)
1997 David Gantz (Gantz Glances)
1998 Wiley Miller (Non Sequitur)
1999 Dan Piraro (Bizarro)
2000 Dan Piraro (Bizarro)
2001 Dan Piraro (Bizarro)
2002 Dave Coverly (Speed Bump)
2003 Jerry Van Amerongen (Ballard Street)
2004 Marcus Hamilton (Dennis the Menace)
2005 Jerry Van Amerongen (Ballard Street)
2006 Hilary B. Price (Rhymes with Orange)
2007 Chad Carpenter (Tundra)
2008 Mark Parisi (off the mark)
2009 Hilary B. Price (Rhymes with Orange)
2010 Glenn McCoy (Flying McCoys)
2011 Mark Parisi (Off The Mark)
2012 Hilary B. Price (Rhymes with Orange)
2013 Dave Coverly (Speed Bump)
2014 Hilary B. Price (Rhymes With Orange)
2015 Dan Piraro (Bizarro)
2016 Nick Galifianakis (Nick and Zuzu)
2017 Mark Parisi (Off the Mark)
2018 Dave Blazek (Loose Parts)
2019 Dave Blazek (Loose Parts)
2020 Mark Parisi (Off the Mark)
2021 Dave Coverly (Speed Bump)

Newspaper Strip Award
The Newspaper Comic Strips (Humor) Category was created in 1957. In 1960, it was joined by the Newspaper Comic Strips (Story) Category. In 1989 the two categories were combined. Also, in 1989 and 1990, Newspaper Panel Cartoon was part of this category.

1957 Gus Arriola (Gordo) and Frank King (Gasoline Alley) (tie) (Humor)
1958 Martin Branner (Winnie Winkle) (Humor)
1959 Dik Browne (Hi and Lois) (Humor)
1960 Dik Browne (Hi and Lois) (Humor) and Leonard Starr (On Stage) (Story)
1961 Ernie Bushmiller (Nancy) (Humor) and Irwin Hasen (Dondi) (Story)
1962 Charles M. Schulz (Peanuts) (Humor) and Irwin Hasen (Dondi) (Story)
1963 Fred Lasswell (Barney Google and Snuffy Smith) (Humor) and Leonard Starr (On Stage) (Story)
1964 Frank O'Neal (Short Ribs) (Humor) and Hal Foster (Prince Valiant) (Story)
1965 Gus Arriola (Gordo) (Humor) and Roy Crane (Buz Sawyer) (Story)
1966 Mort Walker (Beetle Bailey) (Humor) and John Prentice (Rip Kirby) (Story)
1967 Johnny Hart (B.C.) (Humor) and John Prentice (Rip Kirby) (Story)
1968 Al Smith (Mutt and Jeff) (Humor) and Alex Kotzky (Apartment 3-G) (Story)
1969 Mort Walker (Beetle Bailey) (Humor) and Stan Drake (The Heart of Juliet Jones) (Story)
1970 Bud Blake (Tiger) (Humor) and Stan Drake (The Heart of Juliet Jones) (Story)
1971 Brant Parker (The Wizard of Id) (Humor) and John Cullen Murphy (Big Ben Bolt and Prince Valiant) (Story)
1972 Dik Browne (Hi and Lois) (Humor) and Stan Drake (The Heart of Juliet Jones) (Story)
1973 Mell Lazarus (Miss Peach) (Humor) and Dick Moores (Gasoline Alley) (Story)
1974 Reg Smythe (Andy Capp) (Humor) and John Cullen Murphy (Prince Valiant) (Story)
1975 Russell Myers (Broom-Hilda) (Humor) and Dale Messick (Brenda Starr, Reporter) (Story)
1976 Brant Parker (The Wizard of Id) (Humor) and John Cullen Murphy (Prince Valiant) (Story)
1977 Dik Browne (Hi and Lois) (Humor) and Gil Kane (Star Hawks) (Story)
1978 Bud Blake (Tiger) (Humor) and John Cullen Murphy (Prince Valiant) (Story)
1979 Mell Lazarus (Miss Peach) (Humor) and Milton Caniff (Steve Canyon) (Story)
1980 Brant Parker (The Wizard of Id) (Humor) and Dick Moores (Gasoline Alley) (Story)
1981 Jim Davis (Garfield) (Humor) and Dick Moores (Gasoline Alley) (Story)
1982 Brant Parker (The Wizard of Id) (Humor) and Dick Moores (Gasoline Alley) (Story)
1983 Brant Parker (The Wizard of Id) (Humor) and Leonard Starr (Annie) (Story)
1984 Dik Browne (Hägar the Horrible) (Humor) and John Cullen Murphy (Prince Valiant) (Story)
1985 Jim Davis (Garfield) (Humor) and Dick Moores (Gasoline Alley) (Story)
1986 Dik Browne (Hägar the Horrible) (Humor) and John Prentice (Rip Kirby) (Story)
1987 Art and Chip Sansom (The Born Loser) (Humor) and John Cullen Murphy (Prince Valiant) (Story)
1988 Bill Watterson (Calvin and Hobbes)(Humor) and Jim Scancarelli (Gasoline Alley)(Story)
1989 Johnny Hart (B.C.)
1990 Art and Chip Sansom (The Born Loser)
1991 Lynn Johnston (For Better or For Worse)
1992 Wiley Miller (Non Sequitur)
1993 Bud Grace (Ernie)
1994 Garry Trudeau (Doonesbury)
1995 Rick Kirkman (Baby Blues)
1996 Patrick McDonnell (Mutts)
1997 Scott Adams (Dilbert)
1998 Jerry Scott & Jim Borgman (Zits)
1999 Jerry Scott & Jim Borgman (Zits)
2000 Bud Blake (Tiger)
2001 Brian Crane (Pickles)
2002 Darby Conley (Get Fuzzy)
2003 Stephan Pastis (Pearls Before Swine)
2004 Glenn McCoy (The Duplex)
2005 Brooke McEldowney (9 Chickweed Lane)
2006 Stephan Pastis (Pearls Before Swine)
2007 Jim Meddick (Monty)
2008 Mark Tatulli (Liō)
2009 Jerry Scott and Jim Borgman (Zits)
2010 Jeff Parker and Steve Kelley (Dustin)
2011 Glenn McCoy (The Duplex)
2012 Brian Basset (Red and Rover)
2013 Isabella Bannerman (Six Chix)
2014 Stephan Pastis (Pearls Before Swine)
2015 Terri Libenson (The Pajama Diaries)
2016 Steve Kelley and Jeff Parker (Dustin)
2017 Mike Peters (Mother Goose and Grimm)
2018 Will Henry (Wallace the Brave)
2019 Brian Crane (Pickles)
2020 Ricardo Siri (Macanudo)
2021 John Hambrock (The Brilliant Mind of Edison Lee)

On-Line Comic Strip
The award for webcomics was first awarded in 2012 for work produced during the previous year. It was divided the following year into two separate categories, "On-Line Comics – Short Form" and "On-Line Comics – Long Form".
2011 Jon Rosenberg (Scenes from a Multiverse)

On-Line Comics – Short Form
2012 Graham Harrop (Ten Cats)
2013 Ryan Pagelow (Buni)
2014 Danielle Corsetto (Girls with Slingshots)
2015 Dave Kellett (Sheldon)
2016 Ruben Bolling (Donald & John)
2017 Gemma Correll (Gemma Correll)
2018 Dorothy Gambrell (Cat and Girl)
2019 Jim Benton (Jim Benton)
2020 Rosemary Mosco (Bird and Moon)
2021 Rich Powell (Open Wide)

On-Line Comics – Long Form
2012 Vince Dorse (Untold Tales of Bigfoot)
2013 Jeff Smith (Tuki: Save the Humans)
2014 Minna Sundberg (Stand Still, Stay Silent)
2015 Drew Weing (The Creepy Casefiles of Margo Maloo)
2016 Ngozi Ukazu (OMG Check Please)
2017 John Allison (Bad Machinery)
2018 Yuko Ota and Ananth Hirsh (Barbarous)
2019 Alec Longstreth (Isle of Elsi)
2020 Tom Siddell (Gunnerkrigg Court)
2021 Dan Piraro (Peyote Cowboy)

Variety Entertainment
First introduced in 2019, Variety Entertainment is defined as any newspaper, magazine, or online cartoon feature that contains puzzles, games, activities, trivia, history, or instruction.

2018 Dave Klüg
2019 Joe Wos (Mazetoons)
2020 John Graziano (Ripley's Believe it or Not!)
2021 Bill Morrison (All You Nerd is Love: A Yellow Submarine Puzzle Book)

Discontinued categories

Special Features Award

1965 Jerry Robinson, Flubs and Fluffs
1966 Hal Foster, Prince Valiant
1967 Hal Foster, Prince Valiant
1968 Bruce Stark, Stark Impressions
1969 Chon Day, Brother Sebastian
1970 Jim Berry, Berry's World
1971 Al Jaffee, Mad Fold-Ins
1972 Jim Berry, Berry at the Democratic Convention
1973 Frank Fogarty, Illuminated Scrolls
1974 Burne Hogarth, Jungle Tales of Tarzan
1975 Al Jaffee, Snappy Answers to Stupid Questions
1976 Bil Keane, Channel Chuckles
1977 Sergio Aragones, Mad
1978 Jud Hurd, Health Capsules
1979 Arnold Roth, Humorous Illustration
1980 Sam Norkin, Theatrical Caricature
1981 Don Martin, Mad
1982 Don Martin, Mad
1983 Al Kilgore. Elvis the Paper Doll Book
1984 Kevin McVey, Theatrical Caricature
1985 Mort Drucker, Mad
1986 Mort Drucker, Mad
1987 Mort Drucker, Mad
1988 Mort Drucker, Mad

New Media Award

2000 Bill Hinds
2001 Mark Fiore
2002 Mark Fiore

Sports Cartoons Award

1957 Willard Mullin
1958 Willard Mullin
1959 Willard Mullin
1960 Willard Mullin
1961 Willard Mullin
1962 Willard Mullin
1963 Lou Darvas
1964 Willard Mullin
1965 Willard Mullin
1966 Bruce Stark
1967 Lou Darvas
1968 Bill Gallo
1969 Bill Gallo
1970 Bill Gallo
1971 Karl Hubenthal
1972 Bill Gallo
1973 Bill Gallo
1974 Murray Olderman
1975 Bruce Stark
1976 Arnold Roth
1977 Arnold Roth
1978 Murray Olderman
1979 Karl Hubenthal
1980 Karl Hubenthal
1981 Eddie Germano
1982 Karl Hunbenthal
1983 Bill Gallo
1984 Bill Gallo
1985 Bill Gallo
1986 Bill Hinds
1987 Bill Gallo and Paul Szep (tie)
1988 Bill Gallo
1989 (no award)
1990 (no award)
1991 Pierre Bellocq
1992 Eddie Germano
1993 Drew Litton

Other NCS awards
See: Reuben Award
See: Other NCS awards

See also
List of comics awards

References

American awards
Awards established in 1956
Comics awards
Comic strips
1956 establishments in the United States